The 1950 Northwestern Wildcats team represented Northwestern University during the 1950 Big Nine Conference football season. In their fourth year under head coach Bob Voigts, the Wildcats compiled a 6–3 record (3–3 against Big Ten Conference opponents), finished in fifth in the Big Ten, and outscored their opponents by a combined total of 155 to 143.

Schedule

References

Northwestern
Northwestern Wildcats football seasons
Northwestern Wildcats football